The  or  is a diary written in variant Chinese (hentai-kanbun) by Emperor Uda. It is the oldest extant Japanese court diary.

Description
Uda's diary is valued as a source of information on court practices during his reign and about the antagonism between him and the Fujiwara clan. In addition it provides glimpses into the private life and fears of Emperor Uda. In an entry for the year 889, titled A Dream denied, Uda reveals that at the age of 17 he wanted to become a Buddhist priest and did not anticipate ever to become an emperor. On his father's (Emperor Kōkō) enthronement in 884 he was "shuddering with fear".  In an entry for the second month, sixth day of the same year (March 11, 889) titled For the Love of a Cat, Uda gives a detailed and humorous description of the physical characteristics of his cat and goes on to ascribe her a yin and yang spirituality.

History
According to historical records, ten fascicles of the diary were known in 1313. In the early 20th century it was published in Zoku Zoku Gunsho Ruijū 5.1–14. The extant fragments cover the period from 887 to 890 and occupy about 14 pages in modern printed editions.

See also
List of Japanese classic texts

References

Diaries
Japanese literature
9th century in Japan
Diaries of the Heian period
9th-century Japanese books